The Kingdom of Derge was a kingdom in Kham from the 15th to the 19th century. It was a center of industry, religion and politics, with the seat of its kingdom in the town of Degé. The kings of Derge followed a 1300-year lineage.

At its height, the population of the kingdom consisted of 12–15,000 families. The northern border of the kingdom was defined by Qinghai Lake; on the east, the boundary terminated at those states that utilized the Horpa variation of the Rgyalrongic languages, Chantui and Litang; the southern and western boundaries were defined by Batang, Sanai, Gonjo and Draya; and Lhato and Chamdo, respectively.

The kingdom was known for its metal working and was an important center in the establishment of the Rimé movement in Tibetan Buddhism. The royal family of Derge were known as supporters of art, producing such artists as Situ Panchen, the kingdom's senior court chaplain, who is also known for his contributions to medicine and religion. Regent Queen Tsewang Lhamo (d. 1812) was known for her support of printing and publishing.

History
Degé became the capital of the kingdom in the 15th century under the reign of Lodro Tobden, the 31st in the line of the Derge kings. It was he who invited Thang Tong Gyalpo to establish the renowned Gongchen Monastery in the region. The kingdom expanded during the 18th century under the reign of Tenpa Tsering, who conquered territories to the north.

In the early 1900s, Eric R. Coales prepared a report that included information about the "recent" history of the kingdom for the British. According to Coales' report, in 1895, the Viceroy of Sichuan sent forces into Chantui, led by General Chang Chi, who advanced further into Derge. The king and his family were imprisoned in Chengdu. By the time political intrigue in China had forced the troops to withdraw, the king had died, leaving behind two sons, Doje Senkel and Djembel Rinch'en. The former of these enjoyed the support of the Chinese, but the latter, who may have been illegitimate, had backers in Chantui.  The two struggled over the throne until 1908, when Doje Senkel appealed for assistance to the Chinese General Chao Eh-Feng, who was on military campaign in the area to secure the political primacy of China. Djembel Rinch'en was driven to take sanctuary with the Dalai Lama, Thubten Gyatso; Doje Senkel yielded the kingdom to China in exchange for an allowance. The Chinese retained direct control of Derge until 1918.

The palace of the Derge kings, located next to the Parkhang Monastery, was demolished after 1950 and a school was built on the site.

References

History of Tibet
Former countries in Chinese history
Kham
States and territories established in the 15th century
States and territories disestablished in 1956
Tusi